Men's ice hockey tournaments have been staged at the Olympic Games since 1920; after its introduction at the 1920 Summer Olympics, it was permanently added to the Winter Olympic Games in 1924. Russia has participated in 6 of 23 tournaments, sending 14 goaltenders and 84 skaters. The Russian national team is co-ordinated by the Ice Hockey Federation of Russia and players are chosen by the team's management staff.

Prior to the breakup of the Soviet Union in 1991, Russian players competed as part of the Soviet Union national ice hockey team. Nine former Soviet states became part of the IIHF and started competing internationally, including Belarus, Kazakhstan, Latvia and Russia. At the 1992 Olympics, Armenia, Belarus, Kazakhstan, Russia, Ukraine and Uzbekistan competed as one entity, known as the Unified Team. In the final, the Unified Team defeated Canada to win gold while Czechoslovakia won the bronze. Russia's first tournament as a separate nation came at the 1994 Games, where they lost the bronze medal game to Sweden. The following tournament, Russia advanced to the gold medal game, but was shut out by the Czech Republic and settled for the silver medal. After a bronze medal at the 2002 tournament, Russia has failed to medal in the past two Olympics. The 2014 tournament was hosted in Sochi, and the Russian team didn't win a medal.

The Olympic Games were originally intended for amateur athletes, so the players of the National Hockey League (NHL) and other professional leagues were not allowed to compete. An agreement was reached in 1995 that allowed NHL players to compete in the Olympics, starting with the 1998 Games in Nagano, Japan.

Russia has won two medals in men's ice hockey, a silver medal in the 1998 Games, and a bronze at the 2002 Games; nine players—Pavel Bure, Valeri Bure, Sergei Federov, Sergei Gonchar, Darius Kasparaitis, Igor Kravchuk, Boris Mironov, Alexei Yashin and Alexei Zhamnov—have won medals with both teams. Three players have been inducted into the International Ice Hockey Hall of Fame and Hockey Hall of Fame – Pavel Bure, Sergei Fedorov, and Igor Larionov. Gonchar has played in 24 games over four tournaments, more than any other player. Bure has the record for most goals (11), while Pavel Datsyuk holds the record for most assists (15) and most points (20).

Key

Goaltenders

Reserve goaltenders
These goaltenders were named to the Olympic roster, but did not receive any ice time during games. Ilya Bryzgalov did not play in any games during the 2002 Winter Olympics and Semyon Varlamov did not play during the 2010 Winter Olympics, but both started games at later tournaments.

Skaters

See also
 Russia men's national ice hockey team

Footnotes

References

External links
 Ice Hockey Federation of Russia - Official website

ice hockey
Russia
Russia